The Interlake Region is an informal geographic region of the Canadian province of Manitoba that lies roughly between Lake Winnipeg and Lake Manitoba in the Canadian province of Manitoba. The region comprises 14 rural municipalities, one city (the City of Selkirk), five towns (Arborg Riverton, Stonewall, Teulon and Winnipeg Beach) and one village, Dunnottar. The largest population centre in the region is Selkirk. The second largest is the town of Stonewall. 

Argyle, Manitoba, is the small hamlet that is located on the Principal Meridian of Canada, near the middle of the Interlake Region. 
Sandy Hook is located between Winnipeg Beach and Gimli, a popular summer vacation spot.

Major communities
 Arborg
Riverton
Selkirk
Stonewall
Teulon
Winnipeg Beach
Riverton
Fisher Branch
Ashern
Eriksdale, Manitoba

See also
Interlake provincial electoral district
Selkirk-Interlake federal electoral district

References
Community Profile: Census Division No. 13, Manitoba; Statistics Canada
Community Profile: Census Division No. 14, Manitoba; Statistics Canada
Community Profile: Census Division No. 18, Manitoba; Statistics Canada

External links

Interlake Regional Profile

Geographic regions of Manitoba